Petri Lindroos (born 10 January 1980 in Espoo, Finland) is a melodic death/folk metal guitarist and vocalist. He is currently the lead vocalist in Ensiferum. Previously, he was a founding member and lead vocalist for Norther.

Biography
At 14 years old, Petri (also known as "Pete") began to play the guitar. In 1996 he founded the melodic death metal band Norther with drummer Toni Hallio. In 2004, he joined the folk metal/Viking metal band Ensiferum as lead vocalist and continued to perform and record with Norther until 3 March 2009, when Norther's official website announced his departure from the band to focus more on his duties with Ensiferum. Petri said later in an interview that he did not want to quit the band, and on the contrary, the band members forced him to.

In 2008, Lindroos fell sick and was subsequently unable to perform on the planned Russian tour. For the duration of the tour, bass player Sami Hinkka took over Lindroos' vocals while ex-bassist Jukka-Pekka Miettinen filled in as a sessional guitarist.

Discography

With Norther 

Warlord (2000) - Demo
Released (2002) - CD Single
Dreams of Endless War (2002) - CD
Unleash Hell (2003) - CD Single
Mirror of Madness (2003) - CD
Spreading Death (2004) - CD/DVD Single
Death Unlimited (2004) - CD
Solution 7 EP (2005) - Mini CD
Scream (2006) - CD Single
Till Death Unites Us (2006) - CD
No Way Back (2007) - EP
N (2008)

 With Ensiferum Dragonheads (2006) EP
"One More Magic Potion" (2007) CD SingleVictory Songs (2007) CDFrom Afar (2009) CDUnsung Heroes (2012) CDOne Man Army (2015) CDTwo Paths (2017) CDThalassic'' (2020) CD

References

External links 
Official Private Android App from Petri Lindroos
Last Functional Wayback Machine Cache of Official Norther website
 NORTHER - the Finnish Breeze fansite -
Official Ensiferum website

1980 births
Living people
Finnish heavy metal musicians
Finnish heavy metal guitarists
Finnish heavy metal singers
People from Espoo
21st-century Finnish singers
21st-century guitarists
Ensiferum members
Norther members